Another Bag is an album by saxophonist James Moody recorded in 1962 and released on the Argo label.

Reception

Jason Ankeny of Allmusic states: "Another Bag vaults tenor saxophonist James Moody even further past his bop roots. Another in a series of collaborations with arranger and composer Tom McIntosh, its rich, deep sound is both fiercely cerebral and nakedly emotional... The music is both angular and accessible, bolstered by a clutch of clever, dynamic McIntosh melodies.

Track listing 
All compositions by Tom McIntosh, except as indicated
 "Sassy Lady" - 4:33   
 "Ally (Parts 1, 2, 3)" - 7:25   
 "Spastic" (Ken Duhon) - 2:55   
 "Minuet in G" - 3:00   
 "Cup Bearers" - 6:36   
 "The Day After" - 5:12   
 "Pleyel D'Jaime" (Dennis Sandole) - 2:40

Personnel 
James Moody - tenor saxophone, flute
Paul Serrano - trumpet
John Avant - trombone
Kenny Barron - piano
Ernest Outlaw - bass
Marshall Thompson - drums
Tom McIntosh - arranger

References 

James Moody (saxophonist) albums
1962 albums
Argo Records albums
Albums arranged by Tom McIntosh